Mariana Ávila (born Mariana Ávila de la Torre on April 15, 1979) is a Mexican actress and singer.

Early life
Ávila was born in Mexico City, D.F., Mexico. She started her acting career when she was six years old in a stage play called El pájaro azul. At 12, she got the starring role in Little Orphan Annie" in which she had to sing and dance. At 14, she performed in Cinderella and in the TV show El club de Gaby''.

She studied acting in the juvenile workshop of Pedro Damián and in 1996 in the CEA (Artistic Training Center at Televisa). Currently she is part of a musical group called "Mamá no sabe nada" produced by the record company Melody.

Filmography

References

External links

1979 births
Living people
Mexican child actresses
Mexican telenovela actresses
Mexican film actresses
Actresses from Mexico City
20th-century Mexican actresses
21st-century Mexican actresses
Singers from Mexico City
21st-century Mexican singers
21st-century Mexican women singers